Ooslamaa is a small islet in the Baltic Sea belonging to the country of Estonia.

Ooslamaa has a surface area of 241.60 hectares, with fragmented vegetation. Trees do not grow on the islet.
It is administered by Saaremaa Parish, Saare County  and has been designated as a Habitat/species management area of Nature Reserve and been under protection by the government since 1965.

See also
 List of islands of Estonia

References

External links
European Environment Agency
GetAMap.net
Geographic names

Literature
Raukas, A., Bird, E., Orviku, K. 1994. The Provenance of Beaches on the Estonian Islands of Saaremaa and Hiiumaa. - Proc. Estonian Acad. Of Sci. Geol., 43, 2, 81–92.

Estonian islands in the Baltic
Saaremaa Parish